Henry Norman Graven (June 1, 1893 – February 1, 1970) was a United States district judge of the United States District Court for the Northern District of Iowa.

Education and career

Born in St. James, Minnesota, Graven served as a United States Army combat engineer during World War I. He received an Artium Baccalaureus degree from the University of Minnesota in 1921, and a Bachelor of Laws from the University of Minnesota Law School in 1921. Relocating to Iowa, he was in private practice in Greene, Iowa from 1921 to 1937. From 1936 to 1937, he was a special assistant state attorney general of Iowa and a counsel for the Iowa State Highway Commission. From 1937 to 1944, Graven was a trial court judge of the 12th Judicial District Court of Iowa.

Federal judicial service

Graven was nominated by President Franklin D. Roosevelt on March 3, 1944, to a seat on the United States District Court for the Northern District of Iowa vacated by Judge George Cromwell Scott. He was confirmed by the United States Senate on March 21, 1944, and received his commission on March 24, 1944. He served as Chief Judge in 1961. He assumed senior status on August 31, 1961. His service terminated on February 1, 1970, due to his death in San Antonio, Texas.

References

Sources
 

1893 births
1970 deaths
People from St. James, Minnesota
Iowa state court judges
Judges of the United States District Court for the Northern District of Iowa
United States district court judges appointed by Franklin D. Roosevelt
20th-century American judges
University of Minnesota Law School alumni
Iowa lawyers
United States Army soldiers
Military personnel from Minnesota